Todd B. Morgan (born January 1, 1956) is an American politician. He is a member of the Maryland House of Delegates for District 29C in St. Mary's County, Maryland. He was previously a member of the St. Mary's County Board of Commissioners from 2010 to 2022 and served as its vice president in 2014.

Background
Morgan graduated from Susquehanna University with a bachelor's degree in business administration. He later attended Marshall University, where he earned his Master of Business Administration degree. Morgan moved to St. Mary's County in 1979 following graduation.

Morgan began his career by working at federal United States Department of Defense contractor Science Applications International Corporation in finance and acquisitions. He also previously taught classes for 20 years at various local colleges, including College of Southern Maryland, St. Mary's College of Maryland, and the University of Maryland Global Campus, and as an adjunct assistant professor at Embry-Riddle University. From 2004 to 2010, he was the president of the Southern Maryland Navy Alliance.

In 2010, Morgan was elected to the St. Mary's County Board of Commissioners, and was re-elected in 2014 and 2018. He served as the board's vice president in 2014.

In August 2016, Morgan applied to fill a vacancy in the Maryland House of Delegates left by the appointment of state delegate Tony O'Donnell to the Maryland Public Service Commission. The St. Mary's County Republican Central Committee included Morgan on its list of three potential nominees, but Governor Larry Hogan appointed former Calvert County commissioner Jerry Clark to the seat in September.

In February 2022, Morgan filed to run for the Maryland House of Delegates in District 29C, seeking to succeed retiring state delegate Jerry Clark. He defeated Maryland Adjutant General Timothy Gowen in the Republican primary on July 19, receiving 64.8 percent of the vote.

In the legislature
Morgan was sworn into the Maryland House of Delegates on January 11, 2023. He is a member of the House Environment and Transportation Committee.

Personal life
Morgan has three children named Lauren, Andrew, and Megan. His wife, Maria, died in November 2012 following a long battle with injuries sustained in a traffic accident in July 2011.

Political positions
Morgan self-identifies as a fiscal conservative.

Elections
Morgan opposed a bill introduced by state delegate Brian M. Crosby that would require elections for county commissioners to only be decided by voters within the districts in which the candidate is running rather than at-large, voting in 2021 to ask the Maryland General Assembly for a referendum on the bill and for another another referendum on eliminating districts altogether.

Guns
In May 2020, Morgan voted to designate St. Mary's County as a Second Amendment sanctuary area.

Marijuana
In March 2022, Morgan introduced a resolution that called on the St. Mary's County planning commission to amend the zoning ordinance to allow review of future medical marijuana facilities in the county. The resolution was unanimously approved by the Board of Commissioners. In August, he voted for an ordinance that would restrict medical marijuana growing and processing operations to certain zoning areas.

Social issues
In June 2019, Morgan described a Drag Queen Story Hour event held at the St. Mary's County Library as "going after and targeting the kids for sexuality".

Statewide politics
Morgan endorsed former Maryland Secretary of Commerce Kelly Schulz for governor in 2022.

Electoral history

References

External links
 

21st-century American politicians
1956 births
Living people
Marshall University alumni

Susquehanna University alumni
County commissioners in Maryland
St. Mary's College of Maryland faculty
University of Maryland Global Campus faculty